Guang River Railway bridge is a three-span railway bridge in Thailand. It is situated near the Town of Lamphun, Lamphun Province on the Northern Line Railway. There are three span. Crossings Guang River. There are two road bridges beside this bridge.

Features
It is a three-span truss bridge.

References

External links
 Photos of the bridge (2006) 

Railway bridges in Thailand

Truss bridges